Miami Beach is a coastal resort city in Miami-Dade County, Florida, United States. It was incorporated on March 26, 1915. The municipality is located on natural and man-made barrier islands between the Atlantic Ocean and Biscayne Bay, the latter of which separates the Beach from the mainland city of Miami. The neighborhood of South Beach, comprising the southernmost  of Miami Beach, along with Downtown Miami and the PortMiami, collectively form the commercial center of South Florida. Miami Beach's population is 82,890 according to the 2020 census. It has been one of America's pre-eminent beach resorts since the early 20th century.

In 1979, Miami Beach's Art Deco Historic District was listed on the National Register of Historic Places. The Art Deco District is the largest collection of Art Deco architecture in the world and comprises hundreds of hotels, apartments and other structures erected between 1923 and 1943. Mediterranean, Streamline Moderne and Art Deco are all represented in the District. 

The Historic District is bounded by the Atlantic Ocean on the East, Lenox Court on the West, 6th Street on the South and Dade Boulevard along the Collins Canal to the North. The movement to preserve the Art Deco District's architectural heritage was led by former interior designer Barbara Baer Capitman, who now has a street in the District named in her honor.

Government

Miami Beach is governed by a ceremonial mayor and six commissioners. Although the mayor runs commission meetings, the mayor and all commissioners have equal voting power and are elected by popular election. The mayor serves for terms of two years with a term limit of three terms and commissioners serve for terms of four years and are limited to two terms. Commissioners are voted for citywide and every two years three commission seats are voted upon.

A city manager is responsible for administering governmental operations. An appointed city manager is responsible for administration of the city.  The City Clerk and the City Attorney are also appointed officials.

History 
In 1870, father and son Henry and Charles Lum purchased land on Miami Beach for 75 cents an acre. The first structure to be built on this uninhabited oceanfront was the Biscayne House of Refuge, constructed in 1876 by the United States Life-Saving Service through an executive order issued by President Ulysses S. Grant, at approximately 72nd Street. Its purpose was to provide food, water, and a return to civilization for people who were shipwrecked. The structure, which had fallen into disuse by the time the Life-Saving Service became the U.S. Coast Guard in 1915, was destroyed in the 1926 Miami Hurricane and never rebuilt.

The next step in the development of the future Miami Beach was the planting of a coconut plantation along the shore in the 1880s by New Jersey entrepreneurs Ezra Osborn and Elnathan T. Field, but this was a failed venture. One of the investors in the project was agriculturist John S. Collins, who achieved success by buying out other partners and planting different crops, notably avocados, on the land that would later become Miami Beach. In fact, the pine trees on today's Pinetree Drive served as an erosion buffer for Collins' plantations. Meanwhile, across Biscayne Bay, the City of Miami was established in 1896 with the arrival of the railroad and developed further as a port when the shipping channel of Government Cut was created in 1905, cutting off Fisher Island from the south end of the Miami Beach peninsula.

Collins' family members saw the potential in developing the beach as a resort. This effort got underway in the early years of the 20th century by the Collins/Pancoast family, the Lummus brothers (bankers from Miami) and Indianapolis entrepreneur Carl G. Fisher. Until then, the beach here was only the destination for day-trips by ferry from Miami, across the bay. By 1912, Collins and Pancoast were working together to clear the land, plant crops, supervise the construction of canals to get their avocado crop to market and set up the Miami Beach Improvement Company. There were bathhouses and food stands, but no hotel until Brown's Hotel was built in 1915 (still standing, at 112 Ocean Drive). Much of the interior landmass at that time was a tangled jungle of mangroves. Clearing it, deepening the channels and water bodies, and eliminating native growth almost everywhere in favor of landfill for development, was expensive. Once a 1600-acre, jungle-matted sand bar three miles out in the Atlantic, it grew to 2,800 acres when dredging and filling operations were completed.

With loans from the Lummus brothers, Collins had begun work on a 2½-mile-long wooden bridge, the world's longest wooden bridge at the time, to connect the island to the mainland. When funds ran dry and construction work stalled, Indianapolis millionaire and recent Miami transplant Fisher intervened, providing the financing needed to complete the Collins Bridge the following year in return for a land swap deal. That transaction kicked off the island's first real estate boom. The Collins Bridge cost over $150,000 and opened on June 12, 1913. Fisher helped by organizing an annual speed boat regatta, and by promoting Miami Beach as an Atlantic City-style playground and winter retreat for the wealthy. By 1915, Lummus, Collins, Pancoast, and Fisher were all living in mansions on the island, three hotels and two bathhouses had been erected, an aquarium built, and an 18-hole golf course landscaped.

The Town of Miami Beach was chartered on March 26, 1915; it grew to become a City in 1917. Even after the town was incorporated in 1915 under the name of Miami Beach, many visitors thought of the beach strip as Alton Beach, indicating just how well Fisher had advertised his interests there. The Lummus property was called Ocean Beach, with only the Collins interests previously referred to as Miami Beach. In 1925, the Collins Bridge was replaced by the Venetian Causeway, described as "a series of drawbridges and renamed the Venetian Causeway".

Carl Fisher was the main promoter of Miami Beach's development in the 1920s as the site for wealthy industrialists from the north and Midwest to and build their winter homes here. Many other Northerners were targeted to vacation on the island. To accommodate the wealthy tourists, several grand hotels were built, among them: The Flamingo Hotel, The Fleetwood Hotel, The Floridian, The Nautilus, and the Roney Plaza Hotel. In the 1920s, Fisher and others created much of Miami Beach as landfill by dredging Biscayne Bay; this man-made territory includes Star, Palm, and Hibiscus Islands, the Sunset Islands, much of Normandy Isle, and all of the Venetian Islands except Belle Isle. The Miami Beach peninsula became an island in April 1925 when Haulover Cut was opened, connecting the ocean to the bay, north of present-day Bal Harbour. The great 1926 Miami hurricane put an end to this prosperous era of the Florida Boom, but in the 1930s Miami Beach still attracted tourists, and investors constructed the mostly small-scale, stucco hotels and rooming houses, for seasonal rental, that comprise much of the present "Art Deco" historic district.

Carl Fisher brought Steve Hannagan to Miami Beach in 1925 as his chief publicist. Hannagan set-up the Miami Beach News Bureau and notified news editors that they could "Print anything you want about Miami Beach; just make sure you get our name right." The News Bureau sent thousands of pictures of bathing beauties and press releases to columnists like Walter Winchell and Ed Sullivan. One of Hannagan's favorite venues was a billboard in Times Square, New York City, where he ran two taglines: "'It's always June in Miami Beach' and 'Miami Beach, Where Summer Spends the Winter.'"

Anti-semitism was rampant in the 1920s and into the 30s. Developer Carl Fisher would sell property only to gentiles so Jews were required to live south of Fifth Street. As recently as the 1930s, hotels refused to accept Jews. As the 1930s developed, the "dismantling on Miami Beach of restrictive barriers to Jewish ownership of real estate" was underway; many Jews bought properties from others. 

By the 1940s and 50s, an increasing number of Jewish families built hotels. The first "skyscraper" was the 18-story Lord Tarleton Hotel built in 1940 by Samuel Jacobs. The Jewish mobster Meyer Lansky, who ran some  "carpet joints" (gambling operations) in Florida by 1936, and eventually controlled casinos in Cuba and Las Vegas, retired in Miami and died in Miami Beach. 

During the Second World War, Jewish doctors were not granted staff privileges at any area hospitals so the community built Mount Sinai Medical Center (Miami) on Miami Beach. The North Shore Jewish Center was built in 1951 and became Temple Menorah after an expansion in 1963.

Post–World War II economic expansion brought a wave of immigrants to South Florida from the Northern United States, which significantly increased the population in Miami Beach within a few decades. After Fidel Castro's rise to power in 1959, a wave of Cuban refugees entered South Florida and dramatically changed the demographic make-up of the area. In 2017, one study named zip code 33109 (Fisher Island, a 216-acre island located just south of Miami Beach), as having the 4th most expensive home sales and the highest average annual income ($2.5 million) in 2015.

The sun and warm climate attracted many Jewish families and retirees. One estimate states that "20,000 elderly Jews" were part of the population of the beach in the late 1970s". In a 2017 interview, a demographer from the University of Miami estimated that there "might have been as many as 70,000 Jews in Miami Beach at one point" declining to "around 19,000 in 2014". The decline was motivated partly by "increasing prices during the art deco movement and an 
increase in crime and changing cultural demographics".

In 1980 however, 62 percent of the population of Miami Beach was still Jewish. During the 1980s many of the Jewish citizens left and moved to "Delray Beach, Lake Worth and Boca Raton". During the 1990s, South Beach transformed into a home of the fashion industry and celebrities. In 1999, there were only 10,000 Jewish people living in Miami Beach.

Timeline

1896 – City of Miami founded with the recent arrival extension Henry Flagler's FEC railroad.
1905 – Government Cut manmade shipping channel created separating Miami Beach and Fisher Island.
1912 – Miami Beach Improvement Company founded.
1913 – Collins Bridge (now Venetian Causeway), first bridge between Miami and Miami Beach, built.
1915
Miami Beach incorporated.
John Newton Lummus becomes first mayor of Miami Beach.
Brown's Hotel first hotel built in Miami Beach, still standing today at 112 Ocean Drive.
1920 
Population: 644.
County Causeway (now MacArthur Causeway) connecting Miami and Miami Beach opens.
1925
Venetian Causeway opens.
Miami Beach becomes an island when the Haulover cut opens in April connecting the ocean to the bay just north of Bal Harbour, Florida
1926
Miami Beach sustains significant damage from 1926 Miami hurricane
1928 
Al Capone buys property in Miami Beach.
1928 – 79th Street Causeway built to connect Miami Beach to Hialeah Park Race Track.
1930 – Population: 6,494.
1935 – Many of the famous Art Deco hotels along current day Ocean Drive are built between 1935 and 1941 before the onset of WWII ends construction. Colony (1935), Savoy Plaza (1935), The Tides (1936), Surf Hotel (1936), Beacon (1936), Cavalier (1936), Leslie (1937), Park Central (1937), Barbizon (1937), Waldorf Towers (1937), Victor (1937),  Clevelander (1938), Crescent (1938), Carlyle (1939), Cardozo (1939), Winterhaven (1939), Bentley (1939), Breakwater (1939), Imperial (1939), Majestic (1940), Avalon (1941), Betsy Ross Hotel (1941), St. Charles (1941), Clyde Hotel (1941).
1937 – WKAT radio begins broadcasting.
1940 – Population: 28,012.
1954 – Fontainebleau Hotel in business.
1958 – Miami Beach Convention Center opens.
1959 – Miami International Airport dedicated near Miami Beach.
1960 – Population: 63,145.
1961 – The Julia Tuttle Causeway between Miami and Miami Beach opens.
1968 – August: 1968 Republican National Convention held in Miami Beach.
1971 – Annual South Florida Auto Show begins.
1972 – July: 1972 Democratic National Convention held in Miami Beach.
1972 – August: 1972 Republican National Convention held in Miami Beach.
1973 – February: A mentally ill man firebombs a crowded cafeteria on Collins Avenue, killing three people and injuring about 130. 
1977 – September: 35th World Science Fiction Convention held in Miami Beach.
1979 – Much of Miami South Beach area becomes a historic preservation zone.
1984 – Popular NBC TV show Miami Vice filmed in many locations in Miami and Miami Beach for five seasons between 1984 and 1989.
1997 – July 15: Fashion designer Gianni Versace killed at Casa Casuarina.
2000 – Blue and Green Diamond hi-rises built.
2001 – Murano at Portofino hi-rise built.
2002
Annual international Art Basel Miami Beach (art fair) begins.
Continuum hi-rise built
2004 – Setai Hotel and ICON hi-rise built.
2007 – Matti Herrera Bower becomes mayor.
2010 – Population: 87,779.
2011 – November 1: Miami Beach mayoral election, 2011 held; Bower stays in office.
2013 – Philip Levine becomes mayor.
2015 – November 3: Miami Beach mayoral election, 2015 held; Levine stays in office.
2021 – Miami becomes first city to buy Bitcoin.

Culture 
 
 
South Beach (also known as SoBe, or simply the Beach), the area from Biscayne Street (also known as South Pointe Drive) one block south of 1st Street to about 23rd Street, is one of the more popular areas of Miami Beach. Although topless sunbathing by women has not been officially legalized, female toplessness is tolerated on South Beach and in a few hotel pools on Miami Beach.  Before the TV show Miami Vice helped make the area popular, SoBe was under urban blight, with vacant buildings and a high crime rate. Today, it is considered one of the richest commercial areas on the beach, yet poverty and crime still remain in some places near the area.

Miami Beach, particularly Ocean Drive of what is now the Art Deco District, was also featured prominently in the 1983 feature film Scarface and the 1996 comedy The Birdcage.

Lincoln Road, running east–west parallel between 16th and 17th Streets, is a nationally known spot for outdoor dining and shopping and features galleries of well known designers, artists and photographers such as Romero Britto, Peter Lik, and Jonathan Adler..  In 2015, the Miami Beach residents passed a law forbidding bicycling, rollerblading, skateboarding and other motorized vehicles on Lincoln Road during busy pedestrian hours between 9:00 am and 2:00 am.

Historic preservation 

By the 1970s, jet travel had enabled vacationers from the northern parts of the US to travel to the Caribbean and other warm-weather climates in the winter. Miami Beach's economy suffered. Elderly retirees, many with little money, dominated the population of South Beach.

To help revive the area, city planners and developers sought to bulldoze many of the aging art deco buildings that were built in the 1930s. By one count, the city had over 800 art deco buildings within its borders.

In 1976, Barbara Baer Capitman and a group of fellow activists formed the Miami Design Preservation League (MDPL) to try to halt the destruction of the historic buildings in South Beach. After battling local developers and Washington DC bureaucrats, MDPL prevailed in its quest to have the Miami Beach Art Deco District named to the National Register of Historic Places in 1979. While the recognition did not offer protection for the buildings from demolition, it succeeded in drawing attention to the plight of the buildings.

Due in part to the newfound awareness of the art deco buildings, vacationers, tourists and TV, and movie crews were drawn to South Beach. Investors began to rehabilitate hotels, restaurants and apartment buildings in the area.

Despite the enthusiasm for the historic buildings by many, there were no real protections for historic buildings. As wrecking crews threatened buildings, MDPL members protested by holding marches and candlelight vigils. In one case, protestors stood in front of a hotel blocking bulldozers as they approached a hotel.

After many years of effort, the Miami Beach city commission created the first two historic preservation districts in 1986. The districts covered Espanola Way and most of Ocean Drive and Collins Avenue in South Beach. The designation of the districts helped protect buildings from demolition and created standards for renovation.

While some developers continued to focus on demolition, several investors like Tony Goldman and Ian Schrager bought art deco hotels and transformed them into world famous hot spots in the ‘80s and ‘90s. Among the celebrities that frequented Miami Beach were Madonna, Sylvester Stallone, Cher, Oprah Winfrey and Gianni Versace.

Additional historic districts were created in 1992. The new districts covered Lincoln Road, Collins Avenue between 16th and 22nd Streets and the area around the Bass Museum. In 2005, the city began the process of protecting the mid-century buildings on Collins Avenue between 43rd to 53rd Streets including the Fontainebleau and Eden Roc Hotels. Several North Beach neighborhoods were designated as historic in 2018. A large collection of MiMo (Miami Modern) buildings can be found in the area.

The Arts

Jackie Gleason hosted his Jackie Gleason and His American Scene Magazine (September 29, 1962 – June 4, 1966) television show, after moving it from New York to Miami Beach in 1964, reportedly because he liked year-round access to the golf course at the nearby Inverrary Country Club in Lauderhill (where he built his final home). His closing line became, almost invariably, "As always, the Miami Beach audience is the greatest audience in the world!" In the Fall 1966 television season, he abandoned the American Scene Magazine format and converted the show into a standard variety hour with guest performers. The show was renamed The Jackie Gleason Show, lasting from September 17, 1966 – September 12, 1970. He started the 1966–1967 season with new, color episodes of The Honeymooners, with Sheila MacRae and Jane Kean as Alice Kramden and Trixie Norton, respectively. The regular cast included Art Carney as Ed Norton; Milton Berle was a frequent guest star. The show was shot in color on videotape at the Miami Beach Auditorium (later renamed the Jackie Gleason Theatre of the Performing Arts), now known as Fillmore Miami Beach, and Gleason never tired of promoting the "sun and fun capital of the world" on camera. CBS canceled the series in 1970.

Each December, the City of Miami Beach hosts Art Basel Miami Beach, one of the largest art shows in the United States. Art Basel Miami Beach, the sister event to the Art Basel event held each June in Basel, Switzerland, combines an international selection of top galleries with a program of special exhibitions, parties and crossover events featuring music, film, architecture, and design. Exhibition sites are located in the city's Art Deco District, and ancillary events are scattered throughout the greater Miami metropolitan area.

The first Art Basel Miami Beach was held in 2002. In 2016, about 77,000 people attended the fair. The 2017 show featured about 250 galleries at the Miami Beach Convention Center.

Miami Beach is home to the New World Symphony, established in 1987 under the artistic direction of Michael Tilson Thomas. In January 2011, the New World Symphony made a highly publicized move into the New World Center building designed by Canadian American Pritzker Prize-winning architect Frank Gehry. Gehry is famous for his design of the Guggenheim Museum in Bilbao, Spain, and the Walt Disney Concert Hall in Los Angeles, California. The new Gehry building offers Live Wallcasts™, which allow visitors to experience select events throughout the season at the half-acre, outdoor Miami Beach SoundScape through the use of visual and audio technology on a  projection wall.

Miami beach is also home to Miami New Drama, the resident theater company at the historic Colony Theatre on Lincoln Road. The regional theater company was founded in 2016 by Venezuelan playwright and director, Michel Hausmann, and playwright, director, and Medal of the Arts winner, Moises Kaufman. In October 2016, Miami New Drama took over operations of the Colony Theatre, and since then, the 417-seat Art Deco venue hosts Miami New Drama's theatrical season as well as other live events.

The Miami City Ballet, a ballet company founded in 1985, is housed in a  building near Miami Beach's Bass Museum of Art.

The Miami Beach Festival of the Arts is an annual outdoor art festival that was begun in 1974.

Jewish community

Miami Beach is home to several Orthodox Jewish communities with a network of well-established synagogues and yeshivas, the first of which being the Landow Yeshiva, a Chabad institution in operation for over 30 years. There is also a liberal Jewish community containing such famous synagogues as Temple Emanu-El, Temple Beth Shalom and Cuban Hebrew Congregation. Miami Beach is also a magnet for Jewish families, retirees, and particularly snowbirds when the cold winter sets into the north. These visitors range from the Modern Orthodox to the Haredi and Hasidic – including many rebbes who vacation there during the North American winter. Till his death in 1991, the Nobel laureate writer Isaac Bashevis Singer lived in the northern end of Miami Beach and breakfasted often at Sheldon's drugstore on Harding Avenue.

There are many kosher restaurants and even kollels for post-graduate Talmudic scholars, such as the Miami Beach Community Kollel. Miami Beach had roughly 60,000 people in Jewish households, 62 percent of the total population in 1982, but only 16,500, or 19 percent of the population in 2004, said Ira Sheskin, a demographer at the University of Miami who conducts surveys once a decade. The Miami Beach Jewish community had decreased in size by 1994 due to migration to wealthier areas and aging of the population.

Miami Beach is home to the Holocaust Memorial of the Greater Miami Jewish Federation.

LGBT community 

Miami Beach has been regarded as a gay mecca for decades as well as being one of the most LGBT friendly cities in the United States. Miami Beach is home to numerous gay bars and gay-specific events, and five service and resource organizations. After decades of economic and social decline, an influx of gays and lesbians moving to South Beach in the late-1980s to mid-1990s contributed to Miami Beach's revitalization. The newcomers purchased and restored dilapidated Art Deco hotels and clubs, started numerous businesses and built political power in city and county government.

The passage of progressive civil rights laws, election of outspokenly pro-gay Miami Beach Mayor Matti Bower, and the introduction of Miami Beach's Gay Pride Celebration, have reinvigorated the local LGBT community in recent years, which some argued had experienced a decline in the late 2000s. In January 2010, Miami Beach passed a revised Human Rights Ordinance that strengthens enforcement of already existing human rights laws and adds protections for transgender people, making Miami Beach's human rights laws some of the most progressive in the state.

Miami Beach Pride has gained prominence since it first started in 2009, there has been an increase in attendance every year. In 2013 there were more than 80,000 people who participated to now more than 130,000 people that participate in the festivities every year. It has also attracted many celebrities such as Chaz Bono, Adam Lambert, Gloria Estefan, Mario Lopez, and Elvis Duran who were Grand Marshals for Pride Weekend from 2012 through 2016 respectively.  There are over 125 businesses who are LGBT supportive that sponsor Miami Beach Pride.

Geography

Elevation and tidal flooding

However, a recent study by the University of Miami showed that tidal flooding became much more common from the mid-2000s. The fall 2015 king tides exceeded expectations in longevity and height. Traditional sea level rise and storm mitigation measures including sea walls and dykes, such as those in the Netherlands and New Orleans, may not work in South Florida due to the porous nature of the ground and limestone beneath the surface.

In addition to present difficulty with below-grade development, some areas of southern Florida, especially Miami Beach, are beginning to engineer specifically for sea level rise and other potential effects of climate change. This includes a five-year, US$500 million project for the installation of 60 to 80 pumps, building of taller sea walls, planting of red mangrove trees along the sea walls, and the physical raising of road tarmac levels, as well as possible zoning and building code changes, which could eventually lead to retrofitting of existing and historic properties. However, this plan is not without criticism. Some residents worry that the efforts will not be sufficient to successfully adapt to rising sea levels and wish the city had pursued a more aggressive plan. On the other hand, some worry that the city is moving too quickly with untested solutions. Others yet have voiced concerns that the plan protects big-money interests in Miami Beach. Pump failures such as during construction or power outages, including a Tropical Storm Emily-related rain flood on August 1, 2017, can cause great unexpected flooding. Combined with the higher roads and sidewalks, this leaves unchanged properties relatively lower and prone to inundation.

Climate

According to the Köppen climate classification, Miami Beach has a tropical monsoon climate (Am). Like much of Florida, there is a marked wet and dry season in Miami Beach. The tropical rainy season runs from May through October, when showers and late day thunderstorms are common. The dry season is from November through April, when few showers, sunshine, and low humidity prevail. The island location of Miami Beach, however, creates fewer convective thunderstorms, so Miami Beach receives less rainfall in a given year than neighboring areas such as Miami and Fort Lauderdale. Proximity to the moderating influence of the Atlantic gives Miami Beach lower high temperatures and higher lows than inland areas of Florida. Miami Beach has never reported temperatures below .

Miami Beach's location on the Atlantic Ocean, near its confluence with the Gulf of Mexico, make it extraordinarily vulnerable to hurricanes and tropical storms. Miami has experienced several direct hits from major hurricanes in recorded weather history – the 1906 Florida Keys hurricane, 1926 Miami hurricane, 1935 Yankee hurricane, 1941 Florida hurricane, 1948 Miami Hurricane, 1950 Hurricane King and 1964 Hurricane Cleo, the area has seen indirect contact from hurricanes: 1945 Homestead Hurricane, Betsy (1965), Inez (1966), Andrew (1992), Irene (1999), Michelle (2001), Katrina (2005), Wilma (2005), and Irma (2017).

Water temperature

Surrounding areas

Demographics

2020 census

As of the 2020 United States census, there were 82,890 people, 40,084 households, and 21,028 families residing in the city.

2020 census

, those of Hispanic or Latino ancestry accounted for 53.0% of Miami Beach's population. Out of the 53.0%, 20.0% were Cuban, 4.9% Colombian, 4.6% Argentine, 3.7% Puerto Rican, 2.4% Peruvian, 2.1% Venezuelan, 1.8% Mexican, 1.7% Honduran, 1.6% Guatemalan, 1.4% Dominican, 1.1% Uruguayan, 1.1% Spaniard, 1.0% Nicaraguan, 0.9% Ecuadorian and 0.8% were Chilean.

, those of African ancestry accounted for 4.4% of Miami Beach's population, which includes African Americans. Out of the 4.4%, 1.3% were Black Hispanics, 0.8% were Subsaharan African, and 0.8% were West Indian or Afro-Caribbean American (0.3% Jamaican, 0.3% Haitian, 0.1% Other or Unspecified West Indian, 0.1% Trinidadian and Tobagonian.)

, those of (non-Hispanic white) European ancestry accounted for 40.5% of Miami Beach's population. Out of the 40.5%, 9.0% Italian, 6.0% German, 3.8% were Irish, 3.8% Russian, 3.7% French, 3.4% Polish, 3.0% English, 1.2% Hungarian, 0.7% Swedish, 0.6% Scottish, 0.5% Portuguese, 0.5% Dutch, 0.5% Scotch-Irish, and 0.5% were Norwegian.

, those of Asian ancestry accounted for 1.9% of Miami Beach's population. Out of the 1.9%, 0.6% were Indian, 0.4% Filipino, 0.3% Other Asian, 0.3% Chinese, 0.1% Japanese, 0.1% Korean, and 0.1% were Vietnamese.

In 2010, 2.8% of the population considered themselves to be of only American ancestry (regardless of race or ethnicity), and 1.5% were of Arab ancestry (with the majority of them being of Palestinian and Lebanese descent), .

, there were 67,499 households, while 30.1% were vacant. 13.8% had children under the age of 18 living with them, 26.3% were married couples living together, 8.4% had a female householder with no husband present, and 61.1% were non-families. 49.0% of all households were made up of individuals, and 12.0% had someone living alone who was 65 years of age or older (4.0% male and 8.0% female.) The average household size was 1.84 and the average family size was 2.70.

In 2010, the city population was spread out, with 12.8% under the age of 18, 7.4% from 18 to 24, 38.0% from 25 to 44, 25.7% from 45 to 64, and 16.2% who were 65 years of age or older. The median age was 40.3 years. For every 100 females, there were 109.9 males. For every 100 females age 18 and over, there were 111.0 males.

, the median income for a household in the city was $43,538, and the median income for a family was $52,104. Males had a median income of $42,605 versus $36,269 for females. The per capita income for the city was $40,515. About 10.9% of families and 15.6% of the population were below the poverty line, including 13.0% of those under age 18 and 27.5% of those aged 65 or over.

In 2010, 51.7% of the city's population was foreign-born. Of foreign-born residents, 76.9% were born in Latin America and 13.6% were born in Europe, with smaller percentages from North America, Africa, Asia, and Oceania.

As of 2000, speakers of Spanish at home accounted for 54.90% of residents, while those who spoke exclusively English made up 32.76%. Speakers of Portuguese were 3.38%, French 1.66%, German 1.12%, Italian 1.00%, and Russian 0.85% of the population. Due to the large Jewish community, Yiddish was spoken at the home of 0.81% of the population, and Hebrew was the mother tongue of 0.75%.

Transportation

Public Transportation in Miami Beach is operated by Miami-Dade Transit (MDT). Along with neighborhoods such as Downtown and Brickell, public transit is heavily used in Miami Beach and is a vital part of city life. Although Miami Beach has no direct Metrorail stations, numerous Metrobus lines connect to Downtown Miami and Metrorail (i.e., the 'S' bus line). The South Beach Local (SBL) is one of the most heavily used lines in Miami and connects all major points of South Beach to other major bus lines in the city. Metrobus ridership in Miami Beach is high, with some of the routes such as the L and S being the busiest Metrobus routes.

The Airport-Beach Express (Route 150), operated by MDT, is a direct-service bus line that connects Miami International Airport to major points in South Beach. The ride costs $2.65, and runs every 30 minutes from 6:00 a.m. to 11:00 p.m. seven days a week.

Bicycling
Since the late 20th century, cycling has grown in popularity in Miami Beach. Due to its dense, urban nature, and pedestrian-friendly streets, many Miami Beach residents get around by bicycle.

In March 2011 a public bicycle sharing system named Decobike was launched, one of only a handful of such programs in the United States.  The program is operated by a private corporation, Decobike, LLC, but is partnered with the City of Miami Beach in a revenue-sharing model. Once fully implemented, the program hopes to have around 1000 bikes accessible from 100 stations throughout Miami Beach, from around 85th Street on the north side of Miami Beach all the way south to South Pointe Park.

Education

Miami-Dade County Public Schools serves Miami Beach.

North Beach Elementary
Treasure Island Elementary
South Pointe Elementary
Mater Beach Academy
Biscayne Elementary
Fienberg/Fisher K–8 Center
Nautilus Middle School
Miami Beach Senior High School

Private schools include Rabbi Alexander S. Gross Hebrew Academy, St. Patrick Catholic School, Landow Yeshiva – Lubavitch Educational Center (Klurman Mesivta High School for Boys and Beis Chana Middle and High School for Girls), and Mechina High School. The Roman Catholic Archdiocese of Miami operates St. Patrick Catholic School in Miami Beach. The archdiocese formerly operated Saint Joseph School in Miami Beach.

In the early history of Miami Beach, there was one elementary school and the Ida M. Fisher junior-senior high school. The building of Miami Beach High was constructed in 1926, and classes began in 1928.

Colleges and universities

The Florida International University School of Architecture has a sister campus at 420 Lincoln Road in South Beach, with classroom spaces for FIU architecture, art, music and theater graduate students.

Other Colleges include:
Johnson & Wales University (satellite campus closing at the end of the 2020–2021 school year.)

Neighborhoods

South Beach

Belle Isle
City Center
Di Lido Island
Flagler Monument Island
Flamingo/Lummus
Hibiscus Island
Palm Island
Rivo Alto Island
San Marino Island
Star Island
South of Fifth

Mid-Beach

Oceanfront
Bayshore
Nautilus

North Beach

Biscayne Point
Isle of Normandy
La Gorce
North Shore

Points of interest

Bass Museum
Eden Roc Miami Beach Hotel
The Fillmore Miami Beach (originally the Miami Beach Municipal Auditorium)
Flagler Monument Island
Fontainebleau Hotel
Versace Mansion (Casa Casuarina)
Holocaust Memorial
Jewish Museum of Florida
Lincoln Road
Miami Beach Architectural District
Miami Beach Botanical Garden
North Beach
Ocean Drive
South Beach
South Pointe Park
Wolfsonian-FIU Museum
World Erotic Art Museum Miami
The Setai Hotel

Notable people

George Abbott, playwright, screenwriter, producer, and director
George Ade (1866–1944), writer
Moses Annenberg, newspaper publisher
Desi Arnaz (1917–1986), entertainer
Shmuley Boteach (born 1966), Orthodox rabbi, radio and television host, and author
Walter Briggs, Sr., entrepreneur, owner of the Detroit Tigers
Douglas Isaac Busch, photographer and teacher 
Barbara Baer Capitman, historic preservation activist, writer
Al Capone (1899–1947), mobster
David Caruso, actor and producer, star of NYPD Blue and CSI: Miami
John S. Collins, horticulturist
Kent Cooper, Associated Press
James M. Cox, Governor of Ohio and presidential candidate
Andrew Cunanan, serial killer
Ron Dermer (born 1971), Israeli Ambassador to the US
Harvey Firestone, Firestone Tires
Carl Graham Fisher, developer of Miami Beach
Frank Gannett, Gannett Media Corporation
Jackie Gleason, comedian, actor. TV host (Jackie Gleason and His American Scene Magazine 1964–1966, The Jackie Gleason Show 1966–1970)
Tony Goldman, real estate developer
Ronald Green (1944–2012), American-Israeli basketball player
Gabriel Heatter, radio commentator
Jerry Herman, Broadway composer
John D. Hertz, Hertz Rental Cars
Nunnally Johnson, film director
S.S. Kresge, retailer
Meyer Lansky (1902–1983), mobster
Albert Lasker, businessman
Ring Lardner (1885–1933), writer
Dan Le Batard, ESPN Radio & TV host
Bernarr MacFadden, bodybuilder, owner of the Deauville Hotel
Floyd Mayweather Jr., boxer
Alex Omes, co-founder of Ultra Music Festival
Yaxeni Oriquen-Garcia, IFBB professional bodybuilder
James Cash Penney, department store magnate
Irving Jacob Reuter, General Motors
Grantland Rice, sportswriter
Mark B. Rosenberg, political scientist who was the former President of Florida International University and former Chancellor of the State University System of Florida
Ed Rubinoff (born 1935), tennis player
Damon Runyon, newspaperman and writer
Nicholas Schenck, MGM studios
Dutch Schultz, mobster
Robin Sherwood, actress
Sid Tepper, Songwriter 
Gianni Versace (1946–1997), fashion designer
Betty Viana-Adkins, IFBB professional bodybuilder
Neal Walk (1948–2015), basketball player
Albert Warner, Warner Brothers studio founder
Walter Winchell, columnist
Garfield Wood, inventor

Sister cities

Miami Beach has 12 sister cities
 Brampton, Canada
 Almonte, Spain
 Marbella, Spain
 Fortaleza, Brazil
 Santa Marta, Colombia
 Český Krumlov, Czech Republic
 Nahariya, Israel
 Pescara, Italy
 Fujisawa, Japan
 Cozumel, Mexico
 Ica, Peru
 Basel, Switzerland
 Asmara, Eritrea

Tourism
The City of Miami Beach accounts for more than half of tourism to Miami Dade County. Of the 15.86 million people staying in the county in 2017, 58.5% lodged in Miami Beach.  Resort taxes account for over 10% of the city's operating budget, providing $83 million in the fiscal year 2016–2017. On average, the city's resort tax revenue grows by three to five percent annually.  Miami Beach hosts 13.3 million visitors each year.  In fiscal year 2016/2017, Miami Beach had over 26,600 hotel rooms. Average occupancy in fiscal year 2015/2016 was 76.4% and 78.5% in fiscal year 2016/2017. Mayor Harold Rosen is credited with beginning the revitalization of Miami Beach when he notably abolished rent control in 1976, a move that was highly controversial at the time.

The Miami Beach Visitor and Convention Authority 
The Miami Beach Visitor and Convention Authority is a seven-member board, appointed by the City of Miami Beach Commission. The authority, established in 1967 by the State of Florida legislature, is the official marketing and public relations organization for the city, to support its tourism industry.

See also

8th & Ocean
Collins Bridge
Causeways
Julia Tuttle Causeway
Macarthur Causeway
Venetian Causeway
Doral Hotel
List of mayors of Miami Beach, Florida
List of tallest buildings in Miami Beach
List of upscale shopping districts
Miami Beach Police Department
Miami Modern Architecture
Miami-Dade County
Ocean Drive
Rosie the Elephant
South Beach Tow
Spring Break
A Hole in the Head, 1959 comedy film
The Bellboy, 1960 comedy film
Fair Game, 1995 film

References

Bibliography

1920 ed.

Gallery

External links

Official sites
City of Miami Beach

Photos
Miami Beach Architecture Photos
Photographs of Miami Beach From the State Library & Archives of Florida
Photos of Miami Beach, Miami and surrounding areas

Other
Miami Design Preservation League – Non-profit Organization for the preservation of Miami Beach Architectural History
Miami's Southeast Coast – Biscayne Bay Watershed – Florida DEP

Items related to Miami Beach, various dates (via Digital Public Library of America)
Harris, Alex. “Miami Beach Is Waging War on Sea Rise. One Idea: Turn a Golf Course into Wetlands.” Miamiherald, Miami Herald, 20 Sept. 2019, Wildflower Preserve - Lemon Bay Conservancy. Wildflower Preserve. 
Wood, Travis. “As Hundreds of Golf Courses Close, Nature Gets a Chance to Make a Comeback.” Ensia, As hundreds of golf courses close, nature gets a chance to make a comeback.

 
Cities in Miami-Dade County, Florida
Islands of Miami-Dade County, Florida
Atlantic Coast barrier islands of Florida
Beaches of Miami-Dade County, Florida
Seaside resorts in Florida
Cities in Florida
Populated coastal places in Florida on the Atlantic Ocean
Cities in Miami metropolitan area
Beaches of Florida
Islands of Florida
1915 establishments in Florida
Populated places established in 1915